Tatiana Sergeyevna Danilova (born 25 November 1993) is a Russian pair skater. Competing for Russia with Andrei Novoselov, she is the 2010 Golden Spin of Zagreb silver medalist. Competing for Belarus with Mikalai Kamianchuk, she is the 2015 Toruń Cup silver medalist and has finished in the top ten at two European Championships (2016, 2017).

Career

In Russia 

Danilova began learning to skate in 2000.

In 2009, she teamed up with Andrei Novoselov. The pair was coached by Inna Utkina in Moscow and represented Russia. They placed 8th at the 2010 Russian Junior Championships and appeared on the ISU Junior Grand Prix series the following season, placing 4th in Austria and 6th in Germany. Competing on the senior level, they won the silver medal at the 2010 Golden Spin of Zagreb.

Danilova was unable to skate for a year following a shoulder operation so she told Novoselov that he could look for another partner. After returning to skating, she performed in ice shows for two years.

Partnership with Kamianchuk 
In the 2014–15 season, Danilova began competing for Belarus with Mikalai Kamianchuk. Making their debut as a pair, they placed 6th at the CS Golden Spin of Zagreb in December 2014. They won the silver medal at the Toruń Cup in January 2015. They were second at the Belarusian Championships behind Maria Paliakova / Nikita Bochkov.

Danilova/Kamianchuk finished 10th at the 2016 European Championships in Bratislava and 20th at the 2016 World Championships in Boston, coached by Dmitri Kaplun in Minsk.

The pair placed 10th at the 2017 European Championships in Ostrava. They placed 23rd at the 2017 World Championships in Helsinki.

Programs

With Kamianchuk

With Novoselov

Competitive highlights 
CS: Challenger Series; JGP: Junior Grand Prix

With Kamianchuk for Belarus

With Novoselov for Russia

References

External links 
 

1993 births
Belarusian female pair skaters
Russian expatriate sportspeople in Belarus
Russian female pair skaters
Living people
Figure skaters from Moscow